The Pan Asian Boxing Association, also known as PABA, is an organisation for professional boxing in the Central Asia, Oceania, Pan Pacific, Eurasia and Southeast and Far East nations. It was formed in 1995 and is headquartered in Seoul.

History
Since its inception in 1995 there have been over 800 sanctioned championship matches. Twenty two PABA champions have eventually been crowned as WBA world champions in their respective division, whilst PABA has assisted 37 PABA champions' challenge to the WBA world title. In March 2016, WBA voted at their annual convention to have WBA Oceania title to be the exclusive regional title for the Asia Pacific. Due to this, WBA discontinued their relationship with PABA. PABA created their own sanctioning body called the World Boxing Society. In 2018, PABA and their new sanctioning body WBS disbanded.

Members and affiliates
PABA have 31 Regular Member Nations and 11 Associate Member Nations.

Regular members
 Russian Federation Professional Boxing Federation
 Kazakhstan Professional Boxing Federation
 Kyrgyzstan Professional Boxing Federation
 Mongolia Boxing Commission
 Turkmenistan Professional Boxing Union
 China Boxing Association
 Uzbekistan Boxing Federation
 New Zealand Professional Boxing Association
 New Zealand National Boxing Federation 
 Tajikistan Professional Boxing Federation
 Thailand Boxing Commission
 Indonesia Board of Supervisory & Control for Professional Sports
 Australian National Boxing Federation
 Nepal Professional Boxing Commission
 Belarusian Professional Boxing Association
 Ukraine Professional Boxing League
 New Caledonia Boxing League
 Philippines Game and Amusements Board
 Tahiti (France) Polinesian Boxing Federation
 Fiji Boxing Association
 Moldova Boxing Federation
 DPR (Democratic People's Republic) of Korea Pro Boxing Association
 Tonga Boxing Association
 Papua New Guinea Boxing Association
 Samoa Boxing Association
 Armenia Professional Boxing Federation
 Indian Professional Boxing Association
 Macau Boxing Association
 Dutch (Netherlands) Professional Boxing Federation
 Korea Boxing Commission
 Romania Professional Boxing Council
 Czech Republic Professional Boxing Federation

Associate members
 Singapore
 United States of America
 Cambodia
 Venezuela
 Mexico
 England
 Kenya
 Solomon Islands
 Vanuatu
 Argentina
 Tanzania

References

External links

Professional boxing organizations
Sports organizations established in 1995
Boxing in Asia
Boxing in Oceania
Organizations based in Seoul